The  opened in Uwajima, Ehime Prefecture, Japan in 1992. The Western-style building in which the museum is housed dates to 1884 and is a Registered Tangible Cultural Property. Having started out as the Uwajima Police Station in the Hirōkoji district of Uwajima, in 1953 the building was relocated to Nishiumi, now Ainan, where until January 1990 it served as the town hall.

See also

 Uwajima City Date Museum
 List of Historic Sites of Japan (Ehime)
 List of Cultural Properties of Japan - paintings (Ehime)
 Uwajima Castle

References

External links
  Uwajima City Date Museum

Museums in Ehime Prefecture
Uwajima, Ehime
Museums established in 1992
1992 establishments in Japan